Standings and Results for Group H of the Top 16 phase of the 2011–12 Turkish Airlines Euroleague basketball tournament.

Standings

Fixtures and results

Game 1

Game 2

Game 3

Game 4

Game 5

Game 6

External links
Standings

Group H